Makinsk (Makinsk) is a town in northern-central Kazakhstan. It is the administrative center of Bulandy District in Aqmola Region. Population:

Geography 
Makinsk is located in the Kokshetau Hills, in the northern part of the Kazakh Uplands.

References

Populated places in Akmola Region